Rashtriya Military School, Belgaum is one of the five military schools in India. Entrance tests for the military schools are held each year in December. About 70,000 to 80,000 students attend this test and around 350 students are selected. The schools are run by the Ministry Of Defence for the Indian government.

It was established in 1945 and it is one of the only five RMS (Rashtriya Military School which were formerly called Royal Indian Military Schools) of its kind in India; the other four being Chail Military School founded in 1922, Ajmer  Military School in 1930, Bangalore Military School in 1946 and Dholpur Military School in 1962. RIMC (established in 1922), RIMs and various Sainik Schools contribute 25% to 30%  to various training academies of the Armed Forces. 1 RIMC and 5 RMS were established by the government after the World War I to Indianise the British Colonial Military in India by providing western style education with the aim to prepare the potential pool of future military officers.

History 

Established in 1945, the Belgaum Military School is one of the Rashtriya Military Schools (RMS). All RMS, under the direct control of Directorate General of Military Training (DGMT), are Category 'A' military training institutes at par with Rashtriya Indian Military College (RIMS) and National Defence Academy. All instructions pertaining to finance, training, admission and recruitment are received directly from Army Head Quarters AHQ (MT-15). General Officer Commanding, Karnataka Kerala and Goa Sub Area is Chairman Local Board of Administration. On 1 January 1966, the school was renamed "Belgaum Military School", Belgaum.  In January 1998 the prefix ‘Belgaum’ was dropped and the School was re-designated "Military School, Belgaum". At the thirteenth meeting of the Central Governing Council held on 23 Oct 1990, the aim of a Military School was defined as: "The aim of Military Schools is to impart quality education and prepare cadets to join the Defence Services".

The school buildings include Main Office Block, Boys Hostels, Cadets Mess, Academic block, Temple and Old Assembly Hall, New Assembly Hall, Gymnasium, QM Stores and Canteen, MI Room and Staff Accommodation.

The primary aim of the RMS is to prepare students for the All India Senior Secondary School Certificate Examination of the Central Board of Secondary Education, New Delhi.  The school also prepares boys who wish to join the Indian Armed Forces for the entrance examination of National Defence Academy.  Boys between the age of 10–12 years are eligible for admission to school from Class VI onward. Alumni of the five RMS are known as Georgians after their founder father.

Notable alumni
 Kumud Mishra, Indian film actor
 Ashok Lavasa, Former Election Commissioner
 Baba Kalyani, Kalyani Group

See also
 National Cadet Corps (India) (NCC)
 National Service Scheme (NSS)
 Rashtriya Indian Military College (RIMC)
 Sainik School
 Senior Officers' School, Belgaum

References

External links 
 https://web.archive.org/web/20091201051511/http://www.militaryschoolbelgaum.edu.in/

High schools and secondary schools in Karnataka
Military schools in India
Schools in Belagavi district
Boarding schools in Karnataka
Educational institutions established in 1945
1945 establishments in India